Carex tetrastachya is a species of sedge (family Cyperaceae), native to the U.S. states of New Mexico, Texas, Oklahoma, and Louisiana. It prefers to grow in sandy loam or clay soils in low-lying or otherwise moist areas.

References

tetrastachya
Endemic flora of the United States
Flora of the South-Central United States
Flora of Oklahoma
Flora of Louisiana
Plants described in 1849